Papilio cynorta, the mimetic swallowtail or common white banded papilio, is a butterfly of the family Papilionidae. It is found in Africa, including Sierra Leone, Liberia, Ivory Coast, Ghana, Togo, southern Nigeria, Cameroon, Equatorial Guinea, the Democratic Republic of the Congo, Angola, the Republic of the Congo, Uganda, Kenya and Tanzania.

Adult females mimic Bematistes epaea, the common bematistes butterfly.

The larvae feed on Clausena, Vepris, Calodendrum, Citrus and Fagara species.

Taxonomy
Papilio cynorta is the nominal member of the cynorta species group. The members of the clade are:

Papilio arnoldiana Vane-Wright, 1995
Papilio cynorta Fabricius, 1793
Papilio plagiatus Aurivillius, 1898

References

Carcasson, R. H. (December 1960). "The Swallowtail Butterflies of East Africa (Lepidoptera, Papilionidae)". Journal of the East Africa Natural History Society. (which contains a key to East Africa members of the species group, diagnostic and other notes and figures)

External links
Owen, D. F. (1974). "Exploring Mimetic Diversity in West African Forest Butterflies". Oikos. 25 (2): 227-236. 

Butterflies described in 1793
cynorta